Owl City: Live From Los Angeles is a video album documenting the July 21, 2011 show of American electronica project Owl City's All Things Bright and Beautiful World Tour. It was released on February 7, 2012, by Eagle Rock Entertainment. Filmed at the Club Nokia in Los Angeles, the 94-minute recording was directed by Mark Lucas and produced by John Rubey and Michael A. Blum.

Development and release
The 94-minute recording was directed by Mark Lucas, and was produced by John Rubey and Michael A. Blum. During the concert, Daniel Jorgensen performed guitar and synth, Breanne Düren performed keyboards, synth and sang backing vocals, Laura Musten performed violin, Hannah Schroeder performed cello and bass guitar and Casey Brown performed drums. Speaking about the DVD with Billboard, Young stated;

Owl City: Live From Los Angeles includes footage of live performances of the concert, behind the scenes footage and exclusive interviews. The DVD was available for pre-order on November 29, 2011. The video album was released digitally on iTunes on December 6, 2011, in North America before it was released worldwide on DVD and Blu-ray on February 7, 2012.

Reception

Live From Los Angeles was met with mixed to positive reviews. Scott Fryberger of Jesus Freak Hideout gave a positive review calling the concert a "stellar live show." He also praised Owl City's touring musicians for their versatility and was impressed by their drummer Casey Brown. He ended off remarking, "All in all, this is a terrific DVD." George Lang of The Oklahoman gave a mixed review. He praised the song "Fireflies" for its "visceral arrangement" and "Galaxies" as the apex point of the DVD. However, he was critical of the visual execution of the DVD stating, "the camerawork is nearly devoid of style, providing little more than a front-row seat balanced with audience views."

Track listing

Credits
Credits for Owl City: Live From Los Angeles adapted from the DVD.

Owl City
 Adam Young – lead vocals, piano, synth, guitar, drums, percussion

Additional musicians
 Daniel Jorgensen – synth, guitar, vibraphone, drums, percussion, bass
 Breanne Düren – keyboards, synth, backing vocals
 Laura Musten – violin, synth
 Hannah Schroeder – cello, synth, bass
 Casey Brown – drums, synth, percussion, bass

Production
 Jeff Ravitz – lighting designer
 George Bellias – video editor
 Adam Young – DVD audio mixing, stage design
 Rich Renken – DVD audio mastering
 Danny Graham, Mark Haney – tech manager
 Chris Mitchell, Zach Greenberg – technical director
 Santiago Yniguez, Jason Livingston, Chris Rhodes, Keith Denton, Darien Pasika, Pablo Bryant – camera operator
 Dave Rosenblum – production assistant
 Ryan Chin – creative director
 Dan Bagnall – digital manager
 Adam Jackson – production manage, front of house sound engineer, stage design
 Andy Frost – backline coordinator, playback engineer
 Micah Davis – monitor engineer
 Derek Kern – guitar technician, backline technician
 Paul Holst – lighting designer, lighting director, stage design, lighting programming
 Scot Sepe – bandit lites technician
 Brian Jenkins – lighting programming
 Brent Barrett, Matt King – lighting

Charts

Release history

References

External links

2012 video albums
Owl City albums